The Azores chromis or Atlantic chromis (Chromis limbata) is a species of damselfish from the family Pomacentridae which is found in the Macaronesian Islands of the temperate eastern Atlantic Ocean and has been reported from coastal regions of western Africa.

Description
Chromis limbata is greyish-brown in colour with a dark dorsal fin, anal fin and distal margin of the caudal fin, with its proximate part being whitish. When spawning, the male develops a slightly purple hue as its courtship colours. It has a large eye  and a strongly protractile mouth which reaches the vertical from eye. There are three rows of small canine-like teeth on the jaws. The dorsal fin has 14 spines and 11-12 soft rays while the anal fin has 2 spines and 10-12 soft rays. It grows to 12 cm standard length.

Distribution
Chromis limbata occurs in the Azores and Madeira which are part of Portugal and in the Canary Islands, Spain. It has also been reported off the coast of western Africa from Senegal to Pointe Noire, Congo. It is apparently replaced in the Cape Verde Islands by the endemic Lubbock's chromis (Chromis lubbocki). Small numbers of C. limbata have been recorded off islands in Santa Catarina in southern Brazil and these may be vagrants or may have been introduced through discharge of ships' ballast water.

Biology
The adults of Chromis limbata occur in rocky reefs and sandy-weedy areas, with a depth range of 5–45 meters. They are oviparous and form pairs to breed, the male clears a space on the substrate for the female to lay the eggs in, the eggs adhere to the substrate and the male guards and aerates them.  It is commonest between depths of 5m to 50 m. It can either be found close to the sea bed or it forms pelagic schools. It feeds on small benthic or planktonic invertebrates.

Taxonomy
It was formerly considered conspecific with Chromis chromis but in some areas the two species are sympatric.

Uses
Chromis limbata is a valued food fish in Madeira and is subject to a small scale artisanal fishery, especially off the south and east of the island.

References

External links
 

Azores chromis
Fauna of the Azores
Fauna of Macaronesia
Azores chromis
Taxa named by Achille Valenciennes